Abul Bashar Mohammed Khurshid Alam is a Bangladeshi surgeon. He is incumbent Director General of Directorate General of Health Services of Bangladesh.

Education
Alam passed MBBS from Sir Salimullah Medical College. He obtained FCPS in surgery from Bangladesh College of Physicians and Surgeons and MS in Orthopedic Surgery. He also achieved FRCS from Royal College of Surgeons of England.

Career
Alam was long serving head of the department of surgery at Comilla Medical College. He was head of Surgery at Dhaka Medical College until he took the job as Director General. He also worked as honorary secretary of Bangladesh College of Physicians and Surgeons.

References

Living people
Bangladeshi surgeons
Bangladeshi civil servants
Fellows of the Royal College of Surgeons
Dhaka Medical College alumni
Year of birth missing (living people)